Idiots on the Miniature Golf Course is the debut studio album of experimental rock composer Zoogz Rift, released in 1979 by Snout Records. It is dedicated to Don Van Vliet.

Release and reception 

Critics of the Trouser Press wrote that "this collection of private surrealistic humor, overambitiously complex writing and selfconsciously zany performances sets the tone for much of what was to follow."

Track listing

Personnel 
Adapted from the Idiots on the Miniature Golf Course liner notes.
 Zoogz Rift – guitar, vocals, ARP 2600, production
Musicians
 Steve Bassel – guitar
 Richie Hass – drums, bass guitar, marimba, vibraphone
 Jonathan "Mako" Sharkey – piano
 Jim Simcoe – saxophone
 John Trubee – guitar
 Eric Williams – guitar, bass guitar, violin
 Mark Zimoski – drums

Release history

References

External links 
 Idiots on the Miniature Golf Course at iTunes
 Idiots on the Miniature Golf Course at Discogs (list of releases)

1979 debut albums
SST Records albums
Zoogz Rift albums